Vojdan Stojanovski (born December 9, 1987) is a Macedonian professional basketball player who currently plays for MZT Skopje of the Macedonian League. He is (1.95 m) in height and plays at the shooting guard position. He is the twin brother of Damjan Stojanovski and the younger brother of former basketball player Ognen Stojanovski.

Pro career
Vojdan Stojanovski has played with: KK Vardar Skopje, KK AMAK SP, KK Napredak and KK Feni Industries.

On January 30, 2015, he signed with MoraBanc Andorra of the Liga ACB. On June 10, 2015, he extended his contract with Andorra for two more years.

On June 25, 2017, he signed with Turkish club Büyükçekmece Basketbol.

On July 24, 2018, he signed with EWE Oldenburg

On January 13, 2020, he has signed with BCM Gravelines-Dunkerque of the French LNB Pro A.

On January 31, 2022, Stojanovski signed with MZT Skopje of the Macedonian League.

Achievements
KK AMAK SP
Macedonian Cup Winner - 2009
KK Feni Industries
Macedonian League Champion - 2011
EUROHOLD Balkan League Champion - 2011
BC Donetsk
Ukrainian League Champion - 2012
Alba Berlin
German Cup: 2014

National team
Vojdan Stojanovski is a member of the Macedonian national basketball team. Vojdan helped his team reach the semi-finals of EuroBasket 2011 defeating Lithuania. During quarter-final game against the host, he scored five 3 point shots earning him 15 points and a clean sheet for the game. He has been lauded for his defensive skills during the tournament, earning him a place among the best ball stealers at the Eurobasket 2011.

Career statistics

Euroleague

|-
| style="text-align:left;"| 2014–15
| style="text-align:left;"| Alba Berlin
| 11 || 0 || 13.1 || .378 || .368 || .750 || 1.2 || 1.2 ||  0.5 || 0.0 || 4.3 || 3.4
|- class="sortbottom"
| style="text-align:left;"| Career
| style="text-align:left;"|
| 11 || 0 || 13.1 || .378 || .368 || .750 || 1.2 || 1.2 ||  0.5 || 0.0 || 4.3 || 3.4

Eurocup

|-
| style="text-align:left;"| 2011–12
| style="text-align:left;"| Donetsk
| 7 || 0 || 17.4 || .519 || .333 || .800 || 1.0 || 0.9 || 1.1 || 0.0 || 6.7 || 6.1
|-
| style="text-align:left;"| 2012–13
| style="text-align:left;"| Donetsk
| 6 || 3 || 29.8 || .442 || .333 || .933 || 2.5 || 2.2 || 1.2 || 0.2 || 11.3 || 10.8
|-
| style="text-align:left;"| 2013–14
| style="text-align:left;"| Alba Berlin
| 20 || 0 || 19.9 || .472 || .313 || .882 || 2.7 || 1.2 || 0.5 || 0.1 || 9.8 || 9.3

References

External links
Euroleague.net Profile
FIBA.com profile

1987 births
Living people
Alba Berlin players
BC Andorra players
Expatriate basketball people in Andorra
BC Cherkaski Mavpy players
BC Donetsk players
BCM Gravelines players
Büyükçekmece Basketbol players
EWE Baskets Oldenburg players
KK Napredak Kruševac players
Liga ACB players
Macedonian expatriate basketball people in Serbia
Macedonian expatriate basketball people in Spain
Macedonian expatriate sportspeople in Germany
Macedonian men's basketball players
Real Betis Baloncesto players
Shooting guards
Sportspeople from Skopje
Macedonian twins
Twin sportspeople